Sala Mihai Viteazu  is an indoor arena in Bucharest, Romania. Its best known tenant is the men's basketball club Steaua CSM EximBank București.

References

Sport in Bucharest
Indoor arenas in Romania
Basketball venues in Romania